The Swell Season is a 2011 American documentary film directed by Nick August-Perna, Chris Dapkins and Carlo Mirabella-Davis.

Synopsis
After the success of the Irish movie Once and an Academy Award win, duo Glen Hansard and Markéta Irglová became known all around the world. While Hansard has already been touring for many years, this experience is new to Irglová. She doesn't feel like a prominent person and does feel uncomfortable with all the media attention. Their personal relationship is threatened to fall apart under these often unmanageable circumstances and dynamics.

Background 
When the band The Swell Season went on tour, after the success of the movie Once, Hansard asked his film teacher Carlo Mirabella-Davis to document the tour. The documentary was filmed between 2007 and 2010 by Mirabella-Davis and his co-directors Chris Dapkins and Nick August-Perna. Originally, the documentary should have become a classic music documentary. That changed, however, when the directors shot at Hansard's parents house. The film now became more of a documentary documenting the "burden of dreams and the gradual dissolution or transformation of a romantic relationship". During the shooting the relationship of Hansard and Irglova broke apart. The film was shot in black and white and shows the protagonists Glen Hansard and Markéta Irglová on their tour and at home. It was cut from over 200 hours of film footage.

Reception

Box office
The Swell Season was first shown in 2011 at the Tribeca Film Festival. Several international broadcast followed. In 2012 it was published on DVD in America, in 2014 followed the British release. Furthermore, the movie was published in Germany, Spain, Austria (StudioCanal), Switzerland, Australia (Icon), Korea (Jin Jin) and Canada (Mongrel).

Critical response
Kevin Huber of Filmstarts believes that the film is interesting and worth watching for viewers who know the movie Once. According to him the film would be excellent as bonus material for the Once DVD, but he is not sure if it works out as an independent documentary about Am. Lisa Kennedy of The Denver Post, believes that the creators of the film assumed that the audience would know Once. The perfect audience knows the film Once and is fascinated by Markéta Irglová's acceptance speech.

Carsten Knox of The Coast says the film is indispensable for fans of the music, as well as offering an amazingly intimate insight into the consequences of unexpected celebrity.

Sasha Stone of Awards Daily believes that The Swell Season is an outstanding film that deserves an Oscar nomination.

The Stanford Daily describes the film as a "painfully honest love story set in an extraordinary musical context.". Brian Tucker from Star News Online also believes The Swell Season is one of the better documentaries because it is so open and honest. It shows the love and the pressure to succeed after years of work.

References

External links
 
 The Swell Season on Rotten Tomatoes

2011 films
American documentary films
Documentary films about pop music and musicians
2010s English-language films
2010s American films